Raja Hasan Khan Mewati (died 17 March 1527), son of the previous ruler Raja Alawal Khan was a Muslim Khanzada Rajput ruler of Mewat. His dynasty had ruled Mewat State for nearly 200 years. He was a descendant of Raja Nahar Khan Mewati, who was the Wali of Mewat in 14th century. He re-constructed the Alwar fort in 15th century. He joined the Rajput Confederation with 5,000 allies in the Battle of Khanwa, where he was killed in the battle by Mughal forces led by Babur.

There are some generations of it in Pakistan as well, which are settled in Karachi According to information in Korangi from the descendants of Raja Hassan Kha Mewati Mohammad Shafiq is populated  that he has passed away 2020 His eldest son Mohammad Rustum Qadri His son Mohammad Hasan Meo Rajput Me and Rajput's rain now he is the king

 

There are some generations of it in Pakistan as well, which are settled in Karachi According to information in Korangi from the descendants of Raja Hassan Kha Mewati Mohammad Shafiq is populated  that he has passed away 2020 His eldest son Mohammad Rustum Qadri His son Mohammad Hasan Meo Rajput Me and Rajput's rain now he is the king

There are some generations of it in Pakistan as well, which are settled in Karachi and Punjab

Meo is a community of people that is predominantly found in the Punjab region of Pakistan. The history of Meo in Pakistan is intertwined with the broader history of the region.

The Meo community is said to have originated from the Rajputs, a group of Hindu warriors who ruled over parts of North India and Pakistan during the medieval period. However, over time, many Meo people converted to Islam and adopted the local language and customs.

During the partition of India in 1947, many Meo people migrated from India to Pakistan. The majority of them settled in the Punjab region of Pakistan, particularly in the districts of Bahawalpur, Multan, and Rahim Yar Khan.

Meo people have traditionally been involved in agriculture and livestock rearing. They have a rich cultural heritage and are known for their folk music and dance. Meo women are particularly renowned for their embroidery and handicrafts.

In recent years, Meo people have faced challenges due to poverty, lack of education, and discrimination. However, there have also been efforts to promote their cultural heritage and to provide them with opportunities for economic and social advancement.

References

Bibliography
 

Mewat
1527 deaths
16th-century Indian Muslims
History of Haryana
Year of birth unknown
16th-century Indian monarchs